To buy a firearm in France, in line with the European Firearms Directive, a hunting license or a shooting sport license is necessary depending on the type, function and magazine capacity of the weapon.

History
In 1563, Charles IX of France had an address to the Rouen parliament about forbidding firearms in which he made the following statement:

Firearms classification

As of September 2015, classification has been simplified to 4 categories:

 Category A: 
Category A1: Firearms disguised as another object, firearms with fully automatic fire capacities, firearms of a caliber greater than 20mm, handgun magazine with a capacity greater than 20 rounds, and rifles or shotguns magazine with a capacity greater than 31 rounds. There is an exception for magazine capacity for IPSC (TSV in French) shooter with a certificate of the shooting range where they are registered.
 Category A2: military material, material to transport or use weapons in combat and combat-gas protection.
Category A11: semi-automatic rifle shorter than 60 cm with the stock detached or folded.
Category A12: semi-automatic rifle converted from automatic to semi-automatic.
 Category B:  
Category B1: Handguns with a capacity of 20 rounds or fewer.
 Category B2: Manually operated long guns with a capacity between 11 and 31 rounds, semi-automatic long guns with a capacity between 3 and 31 rounds and smooth bore pump-action shotguns. 
 Category B4: Any firearm chambered for the following calibers: 7.62×39mm; 5.56×45mm NATO; 5.45×39mm; .50 BMG; 14.5×114mm.
 Category B5: Any registered parts of all B-categorized firearms such as bolt, barrel, magazine, etc.
 Category B6, B7, B8: Specific weapon for riot and order control (not available to civilians).
 Category C: Generally-accepted hunting weapons in France. Manual operation long guns with a capacity of 11 rounds or less, semi-automatic long guns with a capacity of 3 rounds or fewer. Pump action rifled shotguns with a capacity of 5 rounds or fewer are within C category, as long as they have fixed stocks, fixed capacity of 4+1 or less, barrel length 60cm (23.66 inches) or greater and have overall lengths over 80cm (31 inches). Manually-operated rifles in any caliber must have a barrel length of 45cm (17.7 inches) or greater to be in category C weapon. All shotguns (rifled and smoothbore) must have barrel lengths of 24 inches (60cm) or greater, have fixed stocks, fixed magazines of 2+1 and overall length must be greater than 80cm to be allowed for hunting. https://www.chasseurdefrance.com/pratiquer/les-armes-de-chasse-la-reglementation/ 
 Category D: Pepper spray, canne fusil, blank guns, black powder guns (non-metallic cartridge), deactivated guns, guns with a brevet older than 1 January 1900 (with many exceptions) Exceptions to this are all metallic, smokeless-powder firearms made before 1900 are Category C or Category B weapons. Weapons that shoot projectiles in a non-pyrotechnic way with energy between 2 and 20 joules, and anything used or planned to be used as a weapon.

Individuals cannot own more than twelve B categorized firearms, cannot own more than ten magazines for a given weapon, and cannot store more than 1000 rounds per weapon. For example, if one owned a 9mm pistol then one could store 1000 rounds of 9mm; if one owned two 9mm pistols then one could store up to 2000 rounds.

Hunters can only purchase C category weapons with showing proof of possession of hunting license with the year's validation. Hunters can purchase Category D weapons at anytime whether their hunting license is valid or not. Black powder muzzle loading are allowed to be used for hunting.

Ammunition Classification 
Any handgun ammunition is classified as B, for example, someone who owns a lever-action carbine in C category chamber for .357 magnum needs to have a B categorized weapon to be able to buy .357 magnum ammunition.

Some exceptions exist for calibers like in c-6° category.

 Category B: quota of 2000 rounds per year, maximum of 1000 in stock, you need an id card or resident card and the authorization of ownership to buy those ammunitions.
 7.62×39
 5.56×45 (.223 Remington)
 5.45×39 Russian
 12.7×99
 14.5×114
 Category C-6°: maximum of 1000 in stock, you need an id card or resident card and the acknowledgment of receipt of ownership to buy those ammunitions.
 .25-20 Winchester (6.35×34 R)
 .32-20 Winchester (8×33 Winchester) or 32-20-115
  .38-40 Remington (10.1×33 Winchester)
 .44-40 Winchester ou 44-40-200
  .44 Remington magnum
 .45 Colt or .45 long Colt
 Category C-7°: maximum of 1000 in stock, you need an ID card or resident card and a hunting licence or a shooting licence and the acknowledgment of receipt of ownership to buy those ammunitions.
  7.5×54 MAS
 7.5×55mm Swiss
  .30 M1 (7.62×33)
 7.62×51mm NATO or .308 Winchester
 7.92×57mm Mauser or 7.92×57 JS or 8×57 J or 8×57 JS or 8mm Mauser
 7.62×54mmR or 7.62×54 Mosin Nagant
 7.62×63 or .30-06 Springfield
 .303 British or 7.7×56
 Category C-8°: You need an ID card or resident card and a hunting licence or a shooting licence to buy those ammunitions.
 Auther rifle munition (Ex : 7×64, 9.3×62...)
Category D-1°: You need an ID card or resident card and a hunting licence or a shooting licence to buy those ammunitions. On August 1, 2018 D1 weapons became C categorized.
 Category D-2°: You need an ID card or resident card and must at least 18 years old with the exception of sportive shooters over 12, for whom a written parental authorisation must be written.

On August 1, 2018 D2 ammunition became D.

Storage 

 Category A: Firearms, ammunition and registered firearms parts have to be stored in a gun safe or a safe room.
 Category B: Firearms, ammunition and registered firearms parts have to be stored in a gun safe or a safe room.
 Category C: Firearms can be stored (unloaded) in a safe or without giving easy access using a lock or have them attached to a wall for example, ammunition have to be stored separated from the weapon (even in a safe).
 Category D: 
Category D1: Firearms and ammunition can be stored in a safe or ammunition have to be stored without giving easy access and firearms(unloaded) have to be stored in a way that they can't be used immediately, by using a lock or have them attached to a wall for example. Since August 1, 2018 D1 weapon became C categorized.
 Category D2: No Storage restriction.

Ownership and purchase conditions

Category D requires the owner to be older than 18.
Category C requires the owner to be older than 18, have hunting, shooting or ball-trap license of the current year stamped by a doctor.
Category B requires the owner to be older than 18, be affiliated with a shooting range, have attended at least 3 shooting sessions with an instructor, and have a medical certificate. The shooter then receives a 5-year authorization to purchase and own of Category B firearms (and therefore Category C firearms since they are affiliated with a shooting range). 
Category A11 and A12 purchase not allowed since August 1st 2018, for gun ownership before its same requirement as Category B.

No civilian may carry any weapons in a public place. A special form allows a civilian to apply for a 1-year carry license, which allows them to carry a handgun and a maximum of 50 rounds if they are "exposed to exceptional risks to their life". In practice, such authorizations are rare.

Exceptions exist for children and teenagers with a shooting or ball-trap license and parental approval. A child aged between 9 and 12 can own D categorized weapon that shoot projectiles In a non pyrotechnic way between 2 and 20 joules. A teenager aged 12 to 16 can own C and D categorized weapons. They can also own one-shot, rimfire Category B firearms if they participate in international shooting competitions (only with a shooting licence).

A shooter between the ages of 16 and 18 who has a shooting, hunting or ball-trap license can own C and D categorized weapons. They can also own Category B firearms if they participate in international shooting competitions(only with a shooting licence).

Carrying a gun is defined as having a gun by one's side on a public place ready to use. Transporting a gun is defined as having an unloaded, locked or disassembled gun and having a legitimate reason (personal defence doesn't qualify) for doing so in a public place. A legitimate reason to transport a firearm is a legal document like a hunting, shooting, collector, or ball-trap licence. Hunting, collector and ball-trap licences only work for D and C categorized weapon transportation. A shooting licence works for A, B, C and D categorized weapons.

Showing a firearm in public to scare people can be a charge of public disorder.

Since the November 2015 Paris attacks, police officers are allowed to carry their service firearms while off duty.

References

France
Law of France